New Abdali is an area in the Al-Abdali district in Amman, Jordan. The area already hosts and will further host nearly all of the tallest buildings in Amman, including the current two tallest completed buildings of Amman which are Amman Rotana and W Amman. 

The first phase of the project is nearly complete with the second phase being still on hold.

History
The project's idea was conceived in the early 2000s during a meeting between the then Lebanese prime minister and business tycoon Rafic Hariri, and King Abdullah.

Project components
Source:

Phase I
It is envisioned as the commercial and business center of Amman. Phase I contains the following built up area:

 Residential 287,000 square metres (28%)
 Offices 363,000 square metres (35%)
 Hotels 111,000 square metres (11%)
 Retail 273,000 square metres (26%)
Total: 1,034,000 square metres

Phase II
It is envisioned with a central green park. Phase II contains the following built up area:

 Hotels 62,000 square metres (9%)
 Retail 47,000 square metres (6%)
 Residential 457,000 square metres (63%)
 Offices 156,000 square metres (22%)
Total: 722,000 square metres

Overall project
 Hotels 173,000 square metres (10%)
 Retail 320,000 square metres (18%)
 Residential 744,000 square metres (42%)
 Offices 519,000 square metres (30%)

Total: 1,756,000 square metres

Developments

Phase I of Abdali Project

Completed developments
Abdali Mall Company (Abdali Mall)
Emirates Tourism Investment Company LLC (Amman Rotana)
Abdali Boulevard Company (The Boulevard)
Saraya Abdali for Real Estate & Investment (W Hotel)
Al Riyah Real Estate Development Company (Kawar Keystone)
Jordan Dubai Properties for Land Development Company (Business Square)
Jordan Dubai Islamic Bank
Al Eqtidar for Real Estate Development
The Orphan Fund Development Corporation
Mr. Ziad Asaad Odeh
Mediterranean & Gulf Insurance & Reinsurance Company
AJIB Real Estate Investment Company
Juba Investment & Development Company (Commerce One)
Matrix Development (Crystalle Residence)
Sawa International Company
Irsa'a Real Estate Company
Sultan Bouran, Ishaq Bouran & Fawaz Shalan
Advanced for Real Estate Investment Company
Al Taher Real Estate & Development Company
Al Waleed Real Estate
Audi Bank
EDGO Ventures Ltd (The Atrium)
Adnan Saffarini & Sons
Societe Generale de Banque-Jordan
Abdali views (The Edge Tower)
Al Seraje for Real Estate Development (Abdali Gateway)
Damac Properties Company LLC (The Heights, Lofts & Courtyard)
Abdali Medical Center (AMC)

Planned developments
Abdali Mall Company (Abdali Mall Tower)
Saraya Jordan (Capital Tower)
Abdali Investment & Development PSC (Al-Hamad 1B Tower)
Philadelphia for Commercial Complexes LLC (The Avenue)
Bank al Etihad (K Tower)

Phase II of Abdali Project

Reception 
The Abdali development has been critiqued as creating a neoliberal "urban enclave," the "auto centric" design of which "essentially exclud[es] those who do not have access to a private vehicle."

Gallery

See also

List of tallest buildings in Amman

References

Buildings and structures in Amman
Buildings and structures under construction in Jordan
Economy of Jordan
Tourism in Jordan